Héctor Elpidio Acosta Restituyo, better known as Héctor Acosta "El Torito" (Héctor Acosta "The Little Bull") or simply Héctor Acosta, is a Dominican performer of Merengue and Bachata music. Acosta was the lead singer for the Dominican band Los Toros Band (The Bull Band). Following his departure from the band, he released his debut album Sigo Siendo Yo (I Continue Being Me) in 2006. Its lead single "Me Voy" ("I'm Going") was written by Romeo Santos and it peaked at number 48 on the Billboard Hot Latin Songs chart. In 2008, Acosta released his second album Mitad/Mitad (Half/Half) and it features a cover of Jorge Celedón's song "Sin Perdón" which became a number one hit on the Tropical Songs chart. In the same year, Acosta and Celedón performed a duet titled "Me Vió Llorar" ("Saw Me Weep") which also reached number one on the Tropical Songs chart. The album was certified gold by the RIAA for shipping 30,000 copies in the US. His next albums Simplemente El Torito (Simply The Little Bull) (2009) and Obligame (Obligate Me) (2010) were also certified gold for shipping 50,000 and 30,000 copies respectively. Obligame received a Latin Grammy nomination for Best Contemporary Tropical Album. In 2012, he released his fifth studio album Con el Corazon Abierto (With an Open Heart) and its lead single "Tu Veneno" ("Your Venom") became his third number-one single on the Tropical Songs chart.

Discography 

The following is his discography list:

Studio Albums 
 Sigo Siendo Yo (2006) - D.A.M Pruduction Inc. / Special Edition - Venemusic & Universal Music Latino
 Mitad / Mitad - (2008) - Machete Music & Venemusic
 Simplemente... El Torito	(2009) - D.A.M Pruduction Inc., Venemusic, & Universal Music Latino
 Oblígame (2010) - Venemusic & Universal Music Latino
 Con El Corazón Abierto (2012) - D.A.M Pruduction Inc., Venemusic, & Universal Music Latino
 Merengue Y Sentimiento (2015) - D.A.M Pruduction Inc.
 Este Soy Yo (2022) - La Oreja Media Group Inc.

Live 
 Tipico (2004) - J&N Records

Compilation Albums 
 The Ultimate Bachata Collection (2010) - D.A.M Pruduction Inc., Venemusic, & Universal Music Latino
 The Ultimate Merengue Collection (2011) - D.A.M Pruduction Inc., Venemusic, & Universal Music Latino
 La Historia: Mis Exitos (2014) - D.A.M Pruduction Inc.
 Los Número Uno (2019) - D.A.M Pruduction Inc.

DVD 
 En Vivo (2008) - Universal Music Latino
 Una Noche Con El Torito (2010) - Universal Music Latino

References

20th-century Dominican Republic male singers
21st-century Dominican Republic male singers
Dominican Republic male songwriters
Latin music songwriters
Merengue musicians
Bachata singers
Spanish-language singers
People from Bonao
Living people
1967 births